"Pornography" is a song by the English electronic group Client, released as the third single from their second studio album, City (2004). The track features guest vocals by Carl Barât, who also appears in the video. It peaked at number twenty-two on the UK Singles Chart, the band's highest-peaking single to date.

Track listings
UK CD single (CDTH008)
"Pornography" (Radio Edit) – 3:17
"In the Back of Your Car" – 3:58

UK CD single (LCDTH008)
"Pornography" (Extended Mix) – 5:31
"White Wedding" (Live at Notting Hill Arts Club) – 4:17
"Pornography" (Video)

UK 7" single (TH008)
"Pornography" – 4:08
"Tuesday Night" – 3:39

Charts

References

2004 songs
2005 singles
Client (band) songs
Songs written by Carl Barât